The 5000 and 10000 meters distances for men in the 2014–15 ISU Speed Skating World Cup were contested over six races on six occasions, out of a total of seven World Cup occasions for the season, with the first occasion taking place in Obihiro, Japan, on 14–16 November 2014, and the final occasion taking place in Erfurt, Germany, on 21–22 March 2015.

Jorrit Bergsma of the Netherlands won the cup for the third straight season.

Top three

Race medallists

Standings 
Standings as of 21 March 2015 (end of the season).

References 

 
Men 5000